The Tulsa Signature Symphony is a professional orchestra-in-residence at Tulsa Community College (TCC). It was founded by Dr. G. Barry Epperley in 1978.  Dr. Epperley has announced his retirement effective in 2014.  A replacement has not yet been selected. The orchestra initially started as a small professional chamber orchestra in 1978 called the Tulsa Little Symphony and in the early 1980s became the Oklahoma Sinfonia, presenting a series of pops and light classics at the Brady Theater for more than a decade. In 1997 the orchestra became a much larger ensemble and changed its name to the Tulsa Signature Symphony when it became associated with TCC.

References

External links
Official Site

Musical groups established in 1978
Culture of Tulsa, Oklahoma
American orchestras
Economy of Tulsa, Oklahoma
Tourist attractions in Tulsa, Oklahoma
Performing arts in Oklahoma
Musical groups from Oklahoma